Skin O' My tooth, aka Patrick Mulligan, was created by Baroness Emmuska Orczy (author of the Scarlet Pimpernel series), and appeared in several stories which were collected in Skin o' My Tooth. His Memoirs, By His Confidential Clerk (1928).

Mulligan is an ugly, portly, but particularly sharp Irish lawyer who goes to great lengths (even unscrupulous ones) to get his clients off. Usually this involves him solving the crimes himself. The nickname comes from one client who described Mulligan freeing him "by the skin o' my tooth."

Stories
The following stories first appeared in The Windsor Magazine (June - November) 1903

 The Murder in Saltashe Woods
 The Case of the Polish Prince
 The Case of Major Gibson
 The Duffield Peerage Case
 The Case of Mrs. Norris
 The Murton-Braby Murder

External links
 Skin O' My Tooth at Project Gutenberg Australia
 Skin O' My Tooth on wikisource

1928 short story collections
Fictional amateur detectives
Short story collections by Baroness Emma Orczy
Mystery short story collections